Vijeta may refer to:

 Vijeta (1982 film), a 1982 Indian coming-of-age Hindi film
 Vijeta (1996 film), a 1996 Bollywood action film
 Vijeta (2020 film), a 2020 sports drama film